Huma Nunatak (‘Nunatak Huma’ \'nu-na-tak 'hu-ma\) is the rocky hill rising to 776 m in the west part of Zavera Snowfield, in the northeast foothills of Detroit Plateau on southern Trinity Peninsula in Graham Land, Antarctica.

The nunatak is named after the settlement of Huma in Northeastern Bulgaria.

Location

Maps
 Antarctic Digital Database (ADD). Scale 1:250000 topographic map of Antarctica. Scientific Committee on Antarctic Research (SCAR). Since 1993, regularly upgraded and updated.

Notes

References
 Huma Nunatak. SCAR Composite Antarctic Gazetteer.
 Bulgarian Antarctic Gazetteer. Antarctic Place-names Commission. (details in Bulgarian, basic data in English)

External links
 Huma Nunatak. Copernix satellite image

Nunataks of Trinity Peninsula
Bulgaria and the Antarctic